Fritillaria eastwoodiae, also known as Butte County fritillary or Eastwood's fritillary is a rare member of the Lily family (Liliaceae), native to the foothills of the northern Sierra Nevada, and Cascade Mountains in California and southern Oregon (Jackson County), USA.

Description
Fritillaria eastwoodiae grows to heights from 20 to 80 centimeters, and has linear to narrowly lanceolate leaves arranged on its glaucous stem.  Its flowers are nodding with slightly flared and slightly recurved (curving backwards) tepals.  Its color varies from greenish-yellow mottled to a mixture of red, orange, green and yellow mottling.

Distribution and habitat
Fritillaria eastwoodiae grows in dry open woodlands and chaparral from 500 to 1500 meters, in Shasta, Yuba, Tehama, Butte and El Dorado Counties.  It has also been reported from Jackson County in Oregon. It occurs in similar habitat with F. affinis, F. micrantha, and F. recurva, and blooms from March through May.  It can sometimes be found on serpentine soils.

References

External links
Jepson Manual Treatment - Fritillaria eastwoodiae
USDA Plants Profile; Fritillaria eastwoodiae
Fritillaria eastwoodiae - Photo gallery

eastwoodiae
Flora of California
Flora of Oregon
Flora of the Cascade Range
Flora of the Sierra Nevada (United States)
Natural history of the California chaparral and woodlands
Plants described in 1933
Flora without expected TNC conservation status